Raiya Corsiglia is a film director, producer, editor and actress. She started acting in high school as "Kate" in Taming of the Shrew then went on to the Boston stage, performing in traditional theatre, musicals and original plays. She received a master's degree in film from Art Center College of Design. She was nominated for The Young Director Award at the Cannes Lions International Festival of Creativity. She has been the recipient of eight international Indian Telly Awards for her innovative, fantasy spots and music videos.

Her music video, "Amma" performed by Larisa Stowe and Shakti Tribe won for "Best Director, "Best Cinematographer" and "Best Editor" of which she did all three at the Elevate Film Festival in Los Angeles at the Ford Amphitheater. More recently, her black and white, magic realism film, Blue Dreams Downtown has won Best Short at the Dragon*Con Short Film Festival and was nominated for Best Cinematography at the Calgary Fringe Film Festival as well as being an Official Selection at the Rhode Island International Film Festival, Austin Women in Film Festival, Imaginaria Film Festival in Italy and the Coney Island Film Festival.

She is best known for co-producing Ancanar and also starring as Laliel.

External links

Official site

Year of birth missing (living people)
Living people
American stage actresses
American film directors
21st-century American women